Slavery in Malta existed and was recognised from classical antiquity until the early modern period, as was the case in many countries around the Mediterranean Sea. The system reached its apex under Hospitaller rule, when it took on unprecedented proportions, largely to provide galley slaves for the galleys of the Order, as well as other Christian countries. Commerce raids, which were the backbone of the Knights' economic military system helped to maintain this system, partly through creating the demand for slaves to maintain the military fleet, but also due to the influx of Muslim prisoners when battles were won. Thus Malta became the hub of slavery in Christian Europe. Slavery was abolished in Malta by Napoléon Bonaparte during his invasion of the Maltese archipelago on 16 June 1798.

Before 1530

Slavery in Malta starts in ancient times. All the successive powers in the archipelago used slave labour, from the Romans to the Byzantines, Arabs, Sicilians, until the Knights Hospitallers of the Order of Malta.

At the end of the medieval period pirates, the Genoese and the Maltese added human captives to their loot, these people were often enslaved black Africans. This type of banditry was practised across the Mediterranean coast.

Maltese documents report the presence of domestic slaves throughout the 13th and 14th centuries. A Greek slave called Catherina, for example, was emancipated by an official decree dated from the 23 January 1324. However, it seems that before 1530, the majority of domestic slaves had been black Africans, captured by North Africans at the southern border of their territories. At the end of the fifteenth century, such slaves are found with the rich families of Mdina, but also in the countryside and in Gozo, for example when the priest Peitru Mannara sold his slave Ferha to a fellow countryman. Usual practice seemed to be that slaves would be baptised upon their arrival to the island.

In official deeds, slaves were designated according to their role, their origin, or their religion. They could thus be designated casanaticii (household slaves) or scavi ad usum maghazeni; ethiopes, sylvestri, mauri, greci; or saraceni, christiani ou judei. Beyond domestic tasks they could also be employed for construction work or landscaping.

Emancipation was a relatively commonplace practice, probably depending on human relationships. The emancipated slave would usually take the name of their former master, adding a mark of provenance to avoid any ambiguity: for example, it would be understood that Franciscus de Vaccaro had been emancipated by the Vaccaro family, or Giorgius de Mazarra by the Mazarra family.

This private slavery would continue for a long time after the arrival of the Knights, even if they tried to limit the practice to gain exclusivity. From the 16th century the Order would shift slavery towards its need for rowers on its galleys.

Slave demographics

Slave numbers 

Largely taken from the work of Anne Brogini:

Sex and age 

The majority of slaves working in Malta were men who could manage the extreme strain of the galleys. During the Inquisition in Malta, only 10% of slaves were women, who primarily worked on domestic tasks. However, women and children could be victims of raids on the shores of North Africa.

The exact age of slaves is rarely known, apart from those registered during the Inquisition in Malta. A series of studies from the 17th century determined an average age of 31.

Slave origin 

Approximately 80% of slaves were Muslim or Jewish. They were often captured during military conflicts by the Order and later during pirate raids. Muslim slaves were largely Turks, Moors, or Barbary pirates - as well as limited numbers of sub-Saharan Africans. Jews came from the Levant, the Aegean Islands, Rhodes, Crete, or Venice.

Around 20% were Christian, who came from Greece, the Middle East or Central Europe and may have already been slaves at the time of their capture. They would have to prove their religion before being freed from servitude, but they may have also remained slaves. Over time and according and dictated by need, Greeks were captured and held in slavery as schismatics, or on the pretext that they would trade with the Turks.

This group also included new, former Muslim converts (they were not liberated for converting), as well as renegades who had already changed their faith.

Upon their arrival 

Like all travellers arriving from the sea, captives spent their quarantine upon the ship or in the Lazzaretto of Manoel Island. They were then triaged according to their sex, their age, their robustness, with all these qualities counting towards their market value. If the slaves were captured by a ship belonging to the Order, the knights decided their respective destinations: the galleys, domestic service, gift or sale. If they had been captured by a licensed ship, the captain would pay the Order a certain percentage before disposing the balance as he pleased. The slave was considered to be the total property of their owner.

Those who had not yet found a definitive owner were taken to the public slave market in Valletta, situated on San Giorgio square, (today known as Misrah San Gorg), in front of the Palace of Justice.

In around 1660, for example, more than 700 slaves disembarked, of whom 538 were quickly sold for an average price of 142 Maltese écus or scudi for a man, and 159 écus for a woman. Prices would increase until the beginning of the 18th century, then stabilising as demand decreased, in particular with the continued disbanding of galleys by the great powers (in around 1750 in the French Navy), even if their usage would continue in Malta.

Different functions 

The vast majority of slaves belonged to the order. They were divided into numerous types, with the most robust being destined for the galleys, while the others remained on land and worked in domestic service, as knights' servants, cooks, and workers.

Private slavery also persisted, with every free man being able to buy a slave at the market. These slaves were destined for domestic or agricultural work. This form of private slavery remained restricted by the Order (accounting for about 200 slaves in number for the entire period).

Slaves in Malta were entirely objectified as people, they were turned into saleable objects, as included in the penal code of 1724.

Hospitaller rule

There were a number of female Muslim slaves in Malta during the 18th century. They do not seem to have been intimidated by their status as slaves, and some are known to have openly quarreled or insulted Maltese women, including their own mistresses.

Revolts

Revolt of 1531

On 29 June 1531, the Order had hardly been in Malta for a month. 16 slaves escaped the ramparts of Fort St. Angelo and then opened the doors of the prisons and killed the guards. After a short combat, the two leaders, named Cara Saïm et Cara Mustafa were killed and their bodies left exposed on pikes at the entrance of the Grand Harbour on a strip of land known since then as Punta delle Forche or Gallow's Point, (where Fort Ricasoli was later built). Even if the archives do not mention this revolt, the Order decided upon the construction of a slave prison in 1531. The memory of the event may have remained with the slaves as they were particularly surveilled on the day of the anniversary of the revolt.

This revolt is not mentioned in the Order's archives, and its authenticity is disputed. It is only known from the writings of Giacomo Bosio.

Revolt of 1596

The second known revolt happened in February 1596, and was not discovered until recently as it was almost entirely concealed in the archives. Several slaves suddenly refused to go back to their prisons in Valletta and Città Vittoriosa. They managed to seize the keys of the gates of Valletta and escaped leaving the doors of the  open. They reached the Maltese countryside where they roamed for some days in search of a ship to flee the isle, not without trying to rally slaves whom they met along the way. The escapees were eventually caught and condemned.

This incident created a raw feeling at the heart of the Order, not only because of the security breaches in the prisons, but even more so because of the nighttime opening of the city doors. This episode was traumatic because it demonstrated the vulnerability of the island to an organised Ottoman attack, which had been an obsession since the Great Siege of 1565. It also marked the realisation of security problems presented by the growing number of slaves living on the isle, who, considered a potential support, presented a Trojan horse for new Islamic attacks. The 1749 plot proved the reality of this menace.

The Grand Master Martin Garzez immediately ordered the increased surveillance of prisons. From 1602 onwards, his successor, Alof de Wignacourt promoted new regulation of the management of slaves in Malta. From this point onwards, slaves could not engage in paid activity or engage in trade, except for small sums under the direct surveillance of the Order. The slaves could not rent lodgings either. This regulation would continue with few modifications for the entirety of the 17th century.

Revolt of 1749

In 1749, an extraordinary plot hoping to seize power in Malta through slaves was fomented by the Pasha of Rhodes, who had recently been captured after mutiny on his galley. Thanks to the great liberty he was allowed in Malta, he managed to assemble multiple Muslim slaves around a conspiracy to assassinate the Grand Master Manuel Pinto da Fonseca and many knights during a religious festival in order to conquer Malta. The plot was discovered before his execution which had been scheduled for the 22 June 1749. More than 200 slaves were tried and executed, including the chamber maid of the Grand Master. The Pasha was sent back to Constantinople. The surveillance of slaves was further increased.

Abolition

Slavery was abolished in 1798 during the French occupation of Malta and confirmed later during the Crown Colony of Malta.

See also

Human trafficking in Malta
Slavery in the Ottoman Empire
Islam in Malta

References

Further reading

 
History of Malta
1798 disestablishments in Malta
Human rights abuses in Malta